WPGC-FM (95.5 MHz) is a commercial radio station licensed to Morningside, Maryland and serving the Washington metropolitan area.  It is owned by Audacy, Inc., and airs an urban contemporary format.

WPGC-FM has studios in the Navy Yard neighborhood of Southeast D.C., with its transmitter located off Walker Mill Road at Tanow Place in Capitol Heights, Maryland.  In 2005, WPGC began broadcasting in IBOC digital radio, using the HD Radio system from iBiquity.  The HD-2 digital subchannel carries a simulcast of WJFK-FM.

History

WBUZ
The station signed on the air on January 18, 1948, on the 96.7 frequency with the WBUZ call letters. WBUZ was owned by Arthur Baldwin Curtis, president of Chesapeake Broadcasting Company, Incorporated, and was located in Bradbury Heights. WBUZ-FM broadcasting at 420 watts effective radiated power. The call letters were a play on the word "bus," as WBUZ broadcast background music for a Prince George's County, Maryland based bus company.

In May 1953, WBUZ-FM raised power to 6,300 watts and its city of license was changed to Oakland, Maryland (near District Heights; not the Western Maryland town). Then on June 8, 1953, the Federal Communications Commission (FCC) granted a permit to the station to raise power from 6.3 to 18 kilowatts. WBUZ-FM changed frequency from 96.7 to 95.5 megahertz and power was reduced to 16.5 kilowatts from a new transmitter and tower site on Walker Mill Road in Oakland. The calls were changed to WRNC on March 30, 1956. By the end of the year, WRNC was simulcasting WPGC (AM). The ERP was reduced to 15.7 kilowatts while the power increase authorized for WPGC (AM) in 1955 to 10,000 watts daytime only.

Top 40/"Classy 95"
WPGC-AM, Inc., purchased WRNC in 1956. The calls were changed to WPGC-FM in March 1958. WPGC-FM temporarily went silent until February 1959, as new studios were being constructed for the top 40 format. The call letters stand for "We're Prince George's County", the county in which the station is actually located, but at one time in the 1970s and early 1980s, it was referred to in on-air promos as Where People Get Cash.

WPGC-FM maintained some form of the top 40 format (skewed from rock 'n' roll-based to Adult Contemporary) until 1984, when it flipped to easy listening/adult contemporary WCLY, "Classy 95."

Hip hop/R&B
The format failed and First Media decided to sell all of its properties for $177 million to a minority interest in early 1987. New owners Cook Inlet Media, a group of Alaska Natives, promptly rebuilt the station as CHUrban and reclaimed the WPGC call letters on May 30, 1987. The first song under the new format was "Jam On It" by Newcleus. The station was initially branded WPGC, 95 Jams. In the early 2000s, the branding reverted to simply WPGC 95.5, dropping the Jams moniker from the brand, although it still visibly remained on the station's logo and was used in the slogan. In August 2009, the station rebranded again to 95-5 PGC and changing its longtime slogan from DC's #1, Blazin' At Least 18 Jamz in a Row to DC's Hip Hop and R&B (and briefly to DC's Official #1 for Hip-Hop and R&B in 2010), and WPGC 95.5, DC's Home for At Least 18 Jams in a Row as the primary slogan from 2011 to 2020.  From January 2020 to July 2022, the primary branding and slogan was WPGC 95.5, The DNA of the DMV. The additional slogan of The DMV's Home of R&B, Hip-Hop, and Throwbacks. was introduced shortly after the station shifting back to the urban radio format in June 2021 to July 2022.  As of July 2022, the station on-air moniker and branding is known as WPGC 95.5, DMV's R&B, Hip Hop, and Throwbacks, dropping the prior primary and secondary slogans.

Donnie Simpson hosted The Donnie Simpson Morning Show during the morning drive from March 1993 to January 29, 2010.

Infinity Broadcasting acquired the station and sister station WPGC from Cook Inlet in June 1994 for $60 million. The stations moved to new studios and offices at 4200 Parliament Place, Suite 300 in Lanham, Maryland, in the summer of 2000. In January 2006 owner Viacom split into two companies, Viacom and CBS, and the Infinity Broadcasting name was dropped in favor of CBS Radio.

WPGC announced they were moving their studios from Parliament Place in  Lanham in suburban Maryland to the Navy Yard neighborhood in southeast DC on March 26, 2015.

On February 2, 2017, CBS Radio announced it would merge with Entercom. The merger was approved on November 9, 2017, and was consummated on the 17th.

Programming history
Similar to other long-time rhythmic turned urban stations including KMEL in San Francisco and WQHT in New York, WPGC has evolved into a full-service urban contemporary station that is still monitored by Nielsen BDS as a rhythmic. WPGC-FM also has been a debated topic amongst radio experts about its format classification as a Rhythmic Contemporary Hit radio station even though it really operates musically and programmed as an Urban Contemporary. In 1987, when the current format on WPGC was introduced it was a mix of R&B, hip-hop, dance and pop titles. This came at a time when many radio stations took on the "crossover"-based format for the first time as Emmis Communications pioneered it on KPWR in Los Angeles and WQHT in New York upon acquiring those stations.  In the case of Washington, D.C., the new format niched in well with established R&B stations WKYS, WMMJ and WOL as well as top 40 stations (at the time) WRQX and WAVA-FM.

By 1997, following the departure of longtime assistant program director/music director and afternoon host Albie Dee, its playlist consisted mainly of R&B and hip-hop titles. Many critics say the ability to attract more mainstream advertisers as Rhythmic, rather than Urban, is the real reason. By the early 2000s, WPGC was regularly airing go-go, a local sub-genre of funk, soul, and R&B, made popular by live performers including Chuck Brown, Experience Unlimited, and Rare Essence in local clubs and performance venues.

In June 2009, speculation began circulating that WPGC might be evolving towards a Top 40/CHR direction or back to its former urban-leaning Rhythmic format similar to sister station WZMX. The move might have been fueled by the recent drop in the ratings and in part due to the introduction of PPMs in the market, where it has hurt them audience-wise. However, WPGC remained an urban, albeit a Mainstream Urban (in terms of programming and music playlist, although still basically considered a rhythmic), that focuses primarily on the current urban hits with some recurrents and throwbacks mixed into its playlist.

In December 2010, WPGC began to open up its playlist to include songs that they wouldn't have touched, i.e. Just The Way You Are from Bruno Mars. This issue of whether WPGC might be shifting to a broader Rhythmic sound continued to be debated on message boards like Radio-Info. Even though WPGC-FM was still considered as a rhythmic, it added more rhythmic-friendly tracks but reduced the urban lean from 2010 to 2018.

From 1992 to 1997, WPGC was an original member of the BDS Rhythmic Top 40 panel, when it was moved to BDS's R&B/Hip-Hop reporting panel in 1997. It was the only Rhythmic owned by then CBS Radio that was not listed on the Nielsen BDS rhythmic panel. From 1997 to 2012, Nielsen BDS placed WPGC-FM on the urban panel, while it remained on the rhythmic panel on Mediabase, as Radio One's WKYS is its competitor, but is an urban contemporary station. On June 13, 2012, WPGC returned to the Nielsen BDS Rhythmic Top 40 panel after 15 years.  CBS Radio moved WPGC to the Rhythmic panel from the R&B/Hip-Hop panel due to WPGC becoming more of a hit-driven Rhythmic Top 40 that is more in line with their other Rhythmic outlets and to be more competitive with Top 40/CHR rival WIHT.  However, it retained a heavy urban lean to programming when compared to most rhythmic-formatted stations on the panel. Ironically, they were also the second CBS Radio Rhythmic outlet on the BDS Rhythmic panel with a R&B/Hip-Hop direction, the other being WZMX-Hartford, Connecticut.

WPGC is considered the largest station and co-flagship (along with WVEE) owned by Audacy within its urban/rhythmic division, based on market size (Washington, DC #7). Until August 2012, CBS Radio did list WPGC as an urban on their corporate listings, but by 2012, it was programmed as a hybrid of both formats.  As a result, Atlanta (market rank #8) sister station, WVEE, was considered the largest urban station from 2012 to 2018, but WVEE is still the co-flagship of the company's urban/rhythmic division.  As of January 2018, Audacy does list WPGC-FM as an urban on their station listings, making WPGC the largest urban station within their portfolio once again.

As of April 2021, Mediabase does monitor WPGC-FM as an urban on its weekly station panel.

Current programming

Currently, WPGC is musically programmed as a hit-driven, full-service, urban contemporary station that spins a heavy concentration of mainly contemporary hip-hop, soul, go-go and R&B music with numerous urban music throwbacks throughout the day and an occasional crossover pop hit song. The station directly competes with urban contemporary rival WKYS and urban adult contemporary rivals WMMJ and WHUR full-time, and to a lesser extent the station competes with contemporary hit radio rival WIHT. The station airs current and classic R&B and soul slow jams late nights on Sunday through Thursday dubbed The Coolout. After many years of only giving occasional spins to urban contemporary gospel music that charted well on the Billboard, the station added a program dedicated to the genre on early Sunday mornings. The station also airs urban and crossover pop music throwbacks on Sunday evenings.

While based in Washington, WPGC-FM also competes against Baltimore stations WERQ, an Urban One-owned urban contemporary station and WZFT, an iHeartMedia-owned Top 40/CHR station. It is the only Audacy rhythmic/urban in the Eastern United States to use its call letters as a branding on-air (the other two, KSFM in Sacramento and KLUC-FM in Las Vegas, are both in the Western United States).

Notable on-air personalities
 Joe Clair – former morning drive host from 2015 to 2021
 Donnie Simpson - former morning drive show host from 1993 to 2010
 Big Tigger - former personality that hosted the afternoon drive, nights, and morning drive shows various times throughout the 1990s, 2000s through 2011
 Free (rapper) - former morning drive co-host
 Lil' Mo - former afternoon drive host
 Christina Kelley - former midday show host throughout most of the 1990s

HD Programming

HD2: In March 2006, WPGC launched a HD2 subchannel, which featured a format geared to local Hip-Hop and R&B artists under the billing "Crank." However, by September 2011, the format was replaced with a Dance Top 40 format, billed as "Area 955." In 2021, the format would be replaced with a simulcast of sister station WJFK-FM.
HD3 had been a simulcast of WJFK (1580 AM).  That service was later discontinued.

See also
WIHT
WKYS
KMEL
WVEE
WZMX

References

External links

Urban contemporary radio stations in the United States
Radio stations established in 1958
PGC-FM
1958 establishments in Maryland
Audacy, Inc. radio stations